Moisés Sierra (born September 24, 1988) is a Dominican professional baseball outfielder for the Frederick Atlantic League Team of the Atlantic League of Professional Baseball. He previously played in Major League Baseball (MLB) for the Toronto Blue Jays, Chicago White Sox, and Washington Nationals and in Nippon Professional Baseball (NPB) for the Chunichi Dragons.

Career

Toronto Blue Jays
Sierra began his professional career in 2006, playing for the DSL Blue Jays. That year, he hit .253 with 4 home runs, 26 RBIs, and 17 stolen bases in 69 games. He played for the GCL Blue Jays in 2007, hitting .203 with 5 home runs and 15 RBIs. In 2008, he was with the Lansing Lugnuts, with whom he hit .246 with 9 home runs, 39 RBIs, and 12 stolen bases. He split 2009 between the Dunedin Blue Jays and New Hampshire Fisher Cats, hitting a combined .292 with 6 home runs and 62 RBIs.

In 2010, he split the season between the GCL Blue Jays and Dunedin, hitting a combined .211 in 20 games.

In 2013, he played for Buffalo in the International League and the Blue Jays in the Gulf League, hitting a combined .262 in 103 games.

Sierra was brought up to the Toronto Blue Jays on July 31, 2012, following the trades of Travis Snider and Eric Thames. At the time of his call-up, Sierra was batting .289 with 17 home runs and 63 RBIs in 100 games at Triple-A Las Vegas Sierra made his debut that night against the Seattle Mariners, and recorded his first career hit in his first at bat. On August 13, Sierra hit his first career home run, a solo shot off Chicago White Sox starter Jake Peavy.  In 2012, he batted .224, in 147 at bats.

The Blue Jays optioned Sierra to the Buffalo Bisons on March 3, 2013. Sierra was called up to the Blue Jays on August 21, when José Bautista was placed on the 15-day disabled list.

Sierra started the 2014 season on the Blue Jays' 25-man roster. He was designated for assignment on May 1.

Chicago White Sox
On May 3, 2014, Sierra was claimed by the Chicago White Sox. Sierra found regular time as a reserve outfielder for the White Sox in 2014, hitting .279 with two home runs, before going on the disabled list with a strained oblique on August 16.

Kansas City Royals
On October 24, 2014, Sierra was claimed by the Kansas City Royals. He was designated for assignment and then outrighted to Triple-A on December 16, 2014. He was invited to Spring Training for the 2015 season but did not make the club and was assigned to the Omaha Storm Chasers. He was released by the Royals on July 22, 2015.

Miami Marlins
On December 31, 2015, Sierra signed a minor league contract with the Miami Marlins. He signed a new minor league contract with the Marlins on November 17, 2016. He elected free agency on November 6, 2017.

Washington Nationals
On December 19, 2017, Sierra signed a minor league contract with the Washington Nationals. He was added to the active roster on April 11, 2018, and he made his first major league start since 2014 on April 14 against the Colorado Rockies, driving in two runs.

After 24 games and 60 plate appearances for the Nationals, in which he went 9-for-54 with two doubles and four RBIs, the Nationals designated him for assignment on May 20, 2018. He accepted an outright assignment to the Nationals' Class-AAA affiliate, the Syracuse Chiefs. He declared free agency on October 2, 2018.

Guerreros de Oaxaca
On March 27, 2019, Sierra signed with the Guerreros de Oaxaca of the Mexican League. Sierra slashed a stellar .355/.464/.572 with 18 home runs and 84 RBI in 114 games for Oaxaca in 2019.

Chunichi Dragons
On December 5, 2019, it was announced that Sierra had signed with the Chunichi Dragons of Nippon Professional Baseball League (NPB) on a development contract. On March 26, 2020, Sierra was given a fully rostered deal ahead of the delayed, 2020 season. Sierra made his NPB debut on September 29. On December 2, 2020, he became a free agent.

Tecolotes de los Dos Laredos
On March 4, 2021, Sierra signed with the Tecolotes de los Dos Laredos of the Mexican League. In 53 games, he slashed .299/.385/.462 with 8 home runs and 30 RBIs. He was released following the season on October 20, 2021.

Wild Health Genomes
On February 28, 2022, Sierra signed with the Wild Health Genomes of the Atlantic League of Professional Baseball. He appeared in 76 games for the Genomes, slashing .288/.406/.438 with 8 home runs, 47 RBI, and 11 stolen bases.

Frederick Atlantic League Team
On February 20, 2023, Sierra signed with the unnamed Frederick Atlantic League Team in the Atlantic League of Professional Baseball.

References

External links

 

1988 births
Living people
Buffalo Bisons (minor league) players
Charlotte Knights players
Chicago White Sox players
Chunichi Dragons players
Dominican Republic expatriate baseball players in Canada
Dominican Republic expatriate baseball players in Japan
Dominican Republic expatriate baseball players in Mexico
Dominican Republic expatriate baseball players in the United States
Dominican Summer League Blue Jays players
Dunedin Blue Jays players
Gigantes del Cibao players
Guerreros de Oaxaca players
Gulf Coast Blue Jays players
Jacksonville Suns players
Lansing Lugnuts players
Las Vegas 51s players
Major League Baseball outfielders
Major League Baseball players from the Dominican Republic
New Orleans Baby Cakes players
New Hampshire Fisher Cats players
Omaha Storm Chasers players
Sportspeople from Santo Domingo
Syracuse Chiefs players
Tecolotes de los Dos Laredos players
Toronto Blue Jays players
Washington Nationals players
World Baseball Classic players of the Dominican Republic